The First Fat Truckers Album Is for Sale is the only album by Fat Truckers.  It was released on September 15, 2003 on Roadtrain Recordings.

Track listing
 "Teenage Daughter"
 "Ron Is Back"
 "Superbike"
 "I Love Computers"
 "Favvers Plimsoles"
 "Anorexic Robot"
 "I Love U Son"
 "Roxy's"
 "Lock 'n' Load"
 "Fix It"

References 

Fat Truckers albums
2003 debut albums